In computing, Vinca is a free and open-source remote desktop software helper both for supported user and for remote administrator.

A support service can publish the utility to be downloaded and executed by people who need to be assisted (such as customers). Vinca cares of searching and installing VNC requirements to launch immediately a connection to a public IP or name.

Vinca relies on x11vnc to call the final reverse connection, after checking and diagnosing network and destination availability. Supports any Unix operating system with x11vnc (version 0.6 or newer) and has been distributed with extra repositories for Debian (since version 3.1 sarge) and Ubuntu (since version 4.10 warty).

See also 

 Comparison of remote desktop software
 TeamViewer
 Remote Desktop Services
 Remote desktop software
 Virtual Network Computing (VNC)

References

External links
 Official website

Remote desktop
Virtual Network Computing
Remote administration software
Free network-related software
Remote desktop software for Linux